Parliamentary elections were held in Chile on 7 March 1937. The Liberal Party and the Conservative Party emerged as the largest parties in the Chamber of Deputies and the Senate.

Electoral system
The term length for Senators was eight years, with around half of the Senators elected every four years. This election saw 20 of the 45 Senate seats up for election.

Results

Senate

Chamber of Deputies

References

Elections in Chile
Parliamentary
Chile
Chile
Election and referendum articles with incomplete results